Mieczysław Wachowski (born 21 December 1950) is a Polish politician. He was a minister of state, and close friend and aide of Lech Wałęsa. Before he became a minister of state, he had been a taxi driver, who voluntarily wanted to drive Wałęsa.  He was rumored to be a Secret Police (SB) officer (1980).

References

1950 births
Living people
Polish politicians